The IPSC Swedish Handgun Championship is an IPSC level 3 championship held once a year by the Swedish Dynamic Sports Shooting Association.

Champions 
The following is a list of current and previous champions.

Overall category

Lady category

Junior category

Senior category

Super Senior category

Team category

See also 
Swedish Mini Rifle Championship
Swedish Rifle Championship
Swedish Shotgun Championship

References 

Match Results - 1997 IPSC Swedish Handgun Championship
Match Results - 1998 IPSC Swedish Handgun Championship
Match Results - 1999 IPSC Swedish Handgun Championship
Match Results - 2000 IPSC Swedish Handgun Championship
Match Results - 2001 IPSC Swedish Handgun Championship
Match Results - 2003 IPSC Swedish Handgun Championship, Modified, Open and Production
Match Results - 2003 IPSC Swedish Handgun Championship, Standard and Revolver
Match Results - 2004 IPSC Swedish Handgun Championship
Match Results - 2005 IPSC Swedish Handgun Championship
Match Results - 2006 IPSC Swedish Handgun Championship
Match Results - 2007 IPSC Swedish Handgun Championship
Match Results - 2008 IPSC Swedish Handgun Championship
Match Results - 2009 IPSC Swedish Handgun Championship
Match Results - 2010 IPSC Swedish Handgun Championship
Match Results - 2011 IPSC Swedish Handgun Championship
Match Results - 2012 IPSC Swedish Handgun Championship
Match Results - 2013 IPSC Swedish Handgun Championship, Classic, Production and Revolver
Match Results - 2013 IPSC Swedish Handgun Championship, Open and Standard
Match Results - 2014 IPSC Swedish Handgun Championship, Classic, Revolver and Standard
Match Results - 2014 IPSC Swedish Handgun Championship, Open
Match Results - 2014 IPSC Swedish Handgun Championship, Production
Match Results - 2015 IPSC Swedish Handgun Championship, Classic and Revolver
Match Results - 2015 IPSC Swedish Handgun Championship, Open
Match Results - 2015 IPSC Swedish Handgun Championship, Production
Match Results - 2015 IPSC Swedish Handgun Championship, Standard
Match Results - 2016 IPSC Swedish Handgun Championship, Classic, Revolver and Production
Match Results - 2016 IPSC Swedish Handgun Championship, Open
Match Results - 2016 IPSC Swedish Handgun Championship, Standard
Match Results - 2017 IPSC Swedish Handgun Championship, Open and Standard
Match Results - 2017 IPSC Swedish Handgun Championship, Classic, Revolver and Production

IPSC shooting competitions
National shooting championships
Sweden sport-related lists
Shooting competitions in Sweden